Margo T. Oge is an American engineer and environmental regulator who served as the director of the Environmental Protection Agency's Office of Radiation and Indoor Air from 1990 to 1994 and director of the Office of Transportation and Air Quality from 1994 to 2012. Beginning in 2009, Oge lead the EPA team that authored the 2010-2016 and the 2017-2025 Light-Duty Vehicle Greenhouse Gas Emissions Standards. By 2025, these rules require automakers to halve the greenhouse gas emissions of cars and light duty trucks while doubling fuel economy. These rules were the US federal government's first regulatory actions to reduce greenhouse gases.

Early life and education
Born in Athens, Greece, Oge studied in the United States and received a master's degree in engineering from the University of Massachusetts at Lowell. She later attended George Washington University and the John F. Kennedy School of Government at Harvard University.

EPA career 
Oge began working at the EPA in 1980 in the Office of Toxic Chemicals. In 1986 she was assigned to the office of Rhode Island Senator John Chafee. While there, Oge helped draft a law requiring the plastic six-pack rings to be biodegradable. In 1990 she became the director at the EPA's Office of Indoor Air and Radiation. In 1993, her office released a report finding that secondhand smoke represented a public health danger.  The report was attacked by the tobacco industry and not formally released until courts ruled in favor of EPA in 2002.

In 1994, Oge became director of the Office of Transportation and Air Quality. While there, her office issued multiple regulations aimed at reducing harmful emissions in the transportation industry. In addition to automobiles and trucks, these programs targeted reductions of toxic emissions from heavy-duty trucks, buses, locomotives, marine vessels, off-road equipment gasoline and diesel fuel. Combined, the programs are estimated by the EPA to prevent over 40,000 premature deaths and hundreds of thousands of respiratory illnesses each year. Her office also implemented the Renewable Fuel Standard, which will increase the volume of biofuels in the United States' fuel supply.

2010 and 2012 greenhouse gas regulations 
In 2009, Oge's office, in conjunction with the National Highway Traffic Safety Administration and the state of California, began negotiating new vehicle emissions and fuel economy regulations with automakers. These negotiations resulted in the 2010 light duty vehicle greenhouse gas and corporate average fuel economy standard. The measure targeted increases in fuel economy and reductions in greenhouse gas emissions for new cars in model years 2012 through 2016. These regulations represented the first significant increases in fuel economy since the mid 1980s. They were also the first ever federal regulation to mandate reductions in greenhouse gas emissions.

In 2011 Oge led EPA's efforts working with the National Highway Traffic Safety Administration to set the first climate action to reduce greenhouse gas and improve fuel efficiency of medium to heavy duty trucks up to 23 percent from 2014 to 2018 and save fleet owners $50 billion annually.

In 2012, Oge again lead the EPA efforts on regulation that extended the greenhouse gas emissions reductions through 2025. The regulation will require automakers in the US market to double the fleet-wide fuel efficiency of their 2025 models to 54.5 mpg. The deal also requires automakers to cut greenhouse gas emissions from their 2025 models in half from 2010 levels. The EPA estimates that, by 2025, these rules will double fuel efficiency of cars and trucks, reduce greenhouse gas emissions by 50 percent and save consumers $1.7 trillion in fuel costs. In September 2014, The Economist ranked these standards as the world's sixth most effective measure in slowing climate change.

The regulations require a mid-term review in 2018 and have recently been attacked by auto industry officials.

Post-EPA life 
Oge retired from the EPA in September 2012. She currently serves as a distinguished fellow with the ClimateWorks Foundation, serves as a member of the International Sustainability Council of Volkswagen Group, and as Chair of the Board of the International Council on Clean Transportation. She is also a board member of the National Academies of Science on Energy and Environment, the Union of Concerned Scientists, and a member of the National Academies of Science Advisory Committee for the U.S. Global Change Research Program. In April 2015, Arcade Press released Oge's book Driving the Future: Combating Climate Change with Cleaner, Smarter Cars.

References 

1949 births
Living people